Ho Thi Que, also known as the Tiger Lady of the Mekong Delta and 'Big Sister', was a master sergeant of the South Vietnamese 44th Ranger Battalion, also known as "The Black Tigers" that fought against the Viet Cong during the Vietnam War. She was a field medic and a nurse.

Ho Thi Que was famous for her bravery and courage, earning the nickname "Madame Death" from her Viet Cong adversaries. She was decorated for valour three times. Amongst her fellow rangers she was known for her ferocity, but also for her compassion; she would physically attack any soldier she found looting after battle, but would also comfort and tend to wounded or dying soldiers, often risking her life to reach them on the battlefield. Sometimes she would shave her head to express her grief at the loss of her fellow rangers. She also showed deep compassion for the families of the dead men, fighting for them to receive the benefits due them or lending them money to enable them to become financially independent.

She was a recognisable figure on the battlefield. The Chicago Tribune noted that "she fought beside the men with a pair of .45 automatics ("pearl-handled Colt .45") strapped to her hips and wearing a polished steel helmet emblazoned with a tiger's head." The Tiger Lady was an inspirational figure, often at the front of the battle with the men, charging through paddy fields, spurring her fellow soldiers on to victory. Just a few months before her death she is said to have emerged from a fierce battle against a thousand-strong enemy without a scratch.

Early life
Ho Thi Que was the daughter of a farmer. In the First Indochina War she spied on the French for the Viet Minh until she saw that communists were taking control of the Viet Minh. During this period she met her husband, Nguyen Van Dan, who would later become commander of the 44th Rangers and whom she would follow into battle. They had six children.

Death
In early November 1965 Ho Thi Que was shot and killed by her husband during an argument. He claimed self defence, saying Ho Thi Que had attacked him with a knife in a fit of jealousy over his affair with another woman in Vị Thanh. The prosecutor in the case stated that Nguyen Van Dan had killed his wife as he blamed her for the decline of his career. On 5 May 1966 Nguyen Van Dan was sentenced and served one year in prison for her murder.

Awards 

 Gallantry Cross (South Vietnam) with 3 silver stars
 Presidential Unit Citation (United States)

References

Year of birth missing
1965 deaths
South Vietnamese military personnel of the Vietnam War
Women in the Vietnam War
People murdered in Vietnam
Deaths by firearm in Vietnam